Diana Pereira Hay (born 20 February 1932) is a Danish pianist and composer. Hay was born in Sri Lanka of an Australian father and Sri Lankan mother of part Irish descent. She studied music at the Royal Danish Academy of Music in Copenhagen from 1953–60, learning piano, theory, music history, composition and orchestration. After she completed her studies, she worked as a composer through grants from the National Arts Foundation.

Works
Diana Pereiera Hay composes mainly for piano solo and four-part choir. Selected works include:
I'm still alive, piano solo (1982)
Sonata No. 2, piano solo (1979)
Sonata No. 3, piano solo (1979)

References

1932 births
Living people
20th-century classical composers
Women classical composers
Danish classical composers
Sri Lankan people of Australian descent
Sri Lankan people of Irish descent
Danish people of Sri Lankan descent
Place of birth missing (living people)
Royal Danish Academy of Music alumni
Pupils of Vagn Holmboe
20th-century women composers